Vinay Reddy is an American speechwriter and political advisor serving as the White House director of speechwriting. Reddy was chief speechwriter to Joe Biden during his second term as vice president. After the Obama administration, Reddy worked as vice president of strategic communications for the National Basketball Association.

Early life and education 
The son of immigrants from India, Reddy was born and raised in Dayton, Ohio. He earned a Bachelor of Arts degree from Miami University and a Juris Doctor from the Ohio State University Moritz College of Law.

Career 
Reddy worked as a speechwriter for U.S. Senator Sherrod Brown. He was chief speechwriter to Joe Biden during his second term as Vice President of the United States. During the Obama administration, Reddy was a senior speechwriter for officials of the United States Environmental Protection Agency and the United States Department of Health and Human Services. After the Obama administration, Reddy worked as the vice president of strategic communications for the National Basketball Association.

Reddy served as a senior advisor and speechwriter during the Joe Biden 2020 presidential campaign and the presidential transition. On December 22, 2020, Biden designated Reddy as the incoming White House director of speechwriting.

Personal life 
Reddy and his wife have two daughters.

References

Living people
Year of birth missing (living people)
Place of birth missing (living people)
White House Directors of Speechwriting
Obama administration personnel
Biden administration personnel
American male writers of Indian descent
21st-century American male writers
People of the United States Environmental Protection Agency
United States Department of Health and Human Services officials
National Basketball Association personnel
Writers from Dayton, Ohio
Miami University alumni
Ohio State University Moritz College of Law alumni